Holly Betaudier (1925, Arima, Trinidad and Tobago – May 2016, Glencoe, Illinois, United States) was a radio and television personality from Trinidad and Tobago. He was known as Holly B the Arima Kid for short. He started broadcasting from Chaguaramas during World War II for the US armed forces. He moved to Radio Trinidad then on to Trinidad and Tobago television when it started in 1962 and finally on I95fm He hosted programs like Scouting for Talent, Crix Five with Holly B, Parang with Holly B, Toute Bagai and many more programs.

References

1925 births
2016 deaths
Trinidad and Tobago radio presenters
Trinidad and Tobago television personalities